John Quirk may refer to:

 John Quirk (bishop) (1849–1924), Anglican bishop
 John Quirk (politician) (1870–1938), Australian politician
 John Quirk (footballer) (born 1945), Australian rules footballer

See also
 John Quirke (born 1950), Australian politician
 Johnny Quirke (1911–1983), Irish hurler